Sigurd Lie (May 23, 1871 – September 30, 1904) was a Norwegian composer and conductor.

Lie was born in Drammen. He grew up in Kristiansand, studied in Leipzig in the early 1890s, and then moved to Oslo to work as a conductor. He died of tuberculosis in Oslo in 1904.

Lie is known for romances, and his best-known work is the romance Sne (Snow) with lyrics by Helge Rode. He also wrote other well-regarded Norwegian romances, including Hav (The Sea) and Det er vaar (It Is Spring), both with lyrics by Idar Handagard. He also set poems by Vilhelm Krag to music.

Works
 Konsertstykke (Concert Pieces), for violin and orchestra
 Norsk dans nr. 2 (Norwegian Dance no. 2)
Wartburg, for bass-baritone and orchestra
 Symfoni i a-moll (Symphony in A minor), 1903
Sne (Snow)

References

Further reading
 Grinde, Nils. 1981. Norsk musikkhistorie : hovedlinjer i norsk musikkliv gjennom 1000 år. Oslo: Universitetsforlaget, pp. 254ff. .

1871 births
1904 deaths
Norwegian composers
Norwegian male composers
Norwegian conductors (music)
Norwegian expatriates in Germany
Male conductors (music)
Musicians from Kristiansand
Musicians from Drammen
Tuberculosis deaths in Norway
19th-century male musicians
20th-century deaths from tuberculosis